Festuca polesica is a species of grass, a perennial bunchgrass native to the sand dunes of northern Europe.

Synonym 
 Festuca beckeri (Hack.) Trautv. subsp. polesica (Zapal.) Tzvelev

References 

 GBIF entry
 
 Bull. Int. Acad. Sci. Cracovie, Cl. Sci. Math. 1904:303. 1904
 Alexeev, E. 1979. Genus Festuca L. in Asia Media. Novosti Sist. Vyssh. Rast. 15:66.
 Tutin, T. G. et al., eds. 1964–1980. Flora europaea.
 Tzvelev, N. N. 1976. Zlaki SSSR.
 P. Šmarda, J. Šmerda, A. Knoll, P. Bureš, and J. Danihelka, "Revision of Central European taxa of Festuca ser. Psammophilae Pawlus: morphometrical, karyological and AFLP analysis", Plant Systematics and Evolution, Volume 266, Numbers 3-4 / August, 2007, pages 197-232. ISSN 0378-2697 (Print) 1615-6110 (Online).

polesica
Bunchgrasses of Europe
Flora of Finland
Flora of Germany
Flora of Poland